Clinton Township is a township in Venango County, Pennsylvania, United States. The population was 945 at the 2020 census, an increase from 854 in 2010 and 758 at the 2000 census.

History
The Bridge in Clinton Township and Witherup Bridge are listed on the National Register of Historic Places.

Geography

Demographics

As of the census of 2000, there were 758 people, 278 households, and 219 families residing in the township.  The population density was 26.6 people per square mile (10.3/km2).  There were 414 housing units at an average density of 14.5/sq mi (5.6/km2).  The racial makeup of the township was 97.63% White, 1.32% African American, 0.26% Asian, 0.13% from other races, and 0.66% from two or more races. Hispanic or Latino of any race were 0.13% of the population.

There were 278 households, out of which 30.9% had children under the age of 18 living with them, 66.9% were married couples living together, 5.4% had a female householder with no husband present, and 21.2% were non-families. 18.0% of all households were made up of individuals, and 8.3% had someone living alone who was 65 years of age or older.  The average household size was 2.73 and the average family size was 3.07.

In the township the population was spread out, with 25.9% under the age of 18, 7.8% from 18 to 24, 27.3% from 25 to 44, 25.7% from 45 to 64, and 13.3% who were 65 years of age or older. The median age was 37 years. For every 100 females, there were 107.7 males.  For every 100 females age 18 and over, there were 108.1 males.

The median income for a household in the township was $37,361, and the median income for a family was $40,563. Males had a median income of $32,375 versus $17,656 for females. The per capita income for the township was $16,370.  About 8.1% of families and 11.2% of the population were below the poverty line, including 14.7% of those under age 18 and 3.2% of those age 65 or over.

References

Populated places established in 1798
Townships in Venango County, Pennsylvania
Townships in Pennsylvania